Thula is a sub-district located in Thula District, 'Amran Governorate, Yemen. Thula had a population of 6731 according to the 2004 census.

References 

Sub-districts in Thula District